Sun Set is a box set of various Klaatu rarities, outtakes, demos, live tracks and other recordings from 1973 to 1981. It was launched at the "KlaatuKon" 2005 convention in Toronto, Ontario, Canada. The final nine tracks on disc one are alternate versions of Klaatu's second album project, Hope. Referred to as "The Orchestral Hope", this included a track not present on the version of Hope which was originally released; "Epilogue," which joined "So Said the Lighthouse Keeper" and "Hope".

Track listing

Disc 1
 "Hanus of Uranus" (7" single) (Dee Long)
 "Sub-Rosa Subway" (7" single) (John Woloschuk, Dino Tome)
 "Cherie" (previously unreleased single mix) (Dee Long)
 "Doctor Marvello" (7" single) (John Woloschuk)
 "For You Girl" (7" single B-side) (Dee Long)
 "California Jam" (7" single) (John Woloschuk, Dino Tome)
 "True Life Hero" (TV mix) (Dee Long)
 "Calling Occupants" (anti-adversary mix) (John Woloschuk, Terry Draper)
 "Sir Bodsworth Rugglesby III" (original vocal mix) (John Woloschuk)
 "Little Neutrino" (original vocal mix) (Dee Long)
 "We're Off You Know" (orchestral) (John Woloschuk)
 "Around the Universe in 80 Days" (orchestral) (Dee Long)
 "Madman" (orchestral) (Dee Long)
 "Long Live Politzania" (orchestral) (John Woloschuk)
 "The Loneliest of Creatures" (orchestral) (John Woloschuk)
 "Prelude" (orchestral) (John Woloschuk)
 "So Said the Lighthouse Keeper" (orchestral) (John Woloschuk)
 "Epilogue" (previously unreleased) (orchestral) (John Woloschuk)
 "Hope" (orchestral) (John Woloschuk)

Disc 2
 "A Routine Day" (7" single) (John Woloschuk)
 "Juicy Luicy" (my oh my mix) (John Woloschuk)
 "Everybody Took a Holiday" (megaphone mix) (Dee Long)
 "Older" (live) (Dee Long)
 "Dear Christine" (alternate mix) (John Woloschuk)
 "Mister Manson" (original mix) (Dee Long)
 "Tokeymor Field" (demo) (John Woloschuk)
 "Sir Rupert Said" (studio outtake)
 "Sell Out, Sell Out" (demo) (John Woloschuk)
 "Howl at the Moon" (demo) (John Woloschuk, Dino Tome)
 I Can't Help It" (full-length mix) (Dee Long)
 "Paranoia" (demo) (John Woloschuk)
 "Set the World on Fire" (demo) (John Woloschuk)
 "Dog Star" (demo) (Dee Long)
 "All Good Things" (demo) (John Woloschuk)
 "There's Something Happening" (previously unreleased) (Dee Long)
 "I Don't Wanna Go Home" (demo) (John Woloschuk)
 "At the End of the Rainbow" (alternate vocal mix) (Dee Long)
 "December Dream" (full-length mix) (John Woloschuk, Terry Draper)
 "Mrs. Toad's Cookies" (alternate mix) (John Woloschuk)
 "Magentalane" (full-length mix) (John Woloschuk)
 "Ambrose Lightship" (previously unreleased)

References

Klaatu (band) albums
2005 albums